Tieshan Subdistrict is a subdistrict in Xinluo District, Longyan, Fujian, China. , it administers Jianlong Residential Community and the following nineteen villages: 
Yangtou Village
Waiyang Village
Xixi Village
Yangmei Village
Gekou Village
Linbang Village
Fuxi Village
Pinglin Village
Lujiadi Village
Linghou Village
Zengping Village
Lijiu Village
Xuling Village
Xiejiabang Village
Chenluo Village
Xiacunban Village
Baiyanqian Village
Luocuoshan Village
Huodekeng Village

See also 
 List of township-level divisions of Fujian

References 

Township-level divisions of Fujian
Longyan